The Republican Party of Minnesota is the state affiliate of the Republican Party in Minnesota and the oldest active political party in the state, being founded in 1855. The party controls four of Minnesota's eight congressional House seats. The last Republican governor of the state was Tim Pawlenty, who served from 2003 to 2011.
The party's headquarter is located in Edina, Minnesota and the current chairman is David Hann.

History

Early history
The Republican Party in Minnesota was the dominant party in the state for approximately the first seventy years of Minnesota's statehood, from 1858 through the 1920s.  In the Civil War, the state supported Abolitionism and the Union.

Republican candidates routinely won the state governorship as well as most other state offices, having 12 out of the first 13.

The 1892 Republican National Convention was held in Minneapolis.  The party was aided by an opposition divided between the Democratic Party and the Minnesota Farmer-Labor Party, which eventually merged in 1944.

Independent-Republican era
The Independent-Republicans of Minnesota (I-R) was the name of the party from November 15, 1975, until September 23, 1995. The name change was made because the "Republican" name was damaged by the Watergate Scandal. Polls conducted in the early-mid-1970s indicated people in Minnesota were more likely to vote for a candidate who identified as an "Independent" versus a "Republican". During that time, the state party became more dependent on grassroots fundraising and eventually went bankrupt. After the national party pumped money into the party, in the early-mid-1980s, their image and base began turning more conservative. During this time the party had both US Senate seats and briefly held control of the state House of Representatives. By 1994, the grassroots had turned socially more conservative and changed the name back in 1995. Attempts to drop the term "Independent" had been defeated in 1989, 1991 and 1993.

2000-2010s
For the 2006 U.S. Senate election, the party endorsed Mark Kennedy for United States Senate, who lost to Amy Klobuchar.

In the 2008 U.S. Senate election, incumbent Republican Senator Norm Coleman was defeated by Democratic-Farmer-Labor candidate Al Franken by 312 votes out of over 2.5 million cast after a long series of dramatic, contentious and expensive re-counts.

The Party of Minnesota was fined $170,000 for violating federal campaign finance regulations from 2003 to 2008. The Chairman of the Minnesota Republican Party Tony Sutton (R) was found guilty of circumventing Finance Laws in the Gubernatorial Election Recount of 2010 and fined $33,000. (2010)

The last Republican Governor of Minnesota was Tim Pawlenty. He was elected in 2002 and after winning re-election in 2006, he served two terms, which is the term limit. With Tom Emmer's defeat in 2010 by Mark Dayton, Republicans held the governorship for eight years. Despite having lost every executive race in the general election of 2010, the party captured both chambers of the Minnesota Legislature for the first time since the 1970s, and defeated 18-term Minnesota US Jim Oberstar by electing Chip Cravaack to Minnesota's 8th district.

2010 gubernatorial race
For the 2010 statewide elections, the party endorsed State Representative Tom Emmer and Metropolitan Council member Annette Meeks for governor and lieutenant governor. State Representative Dan Severson was the endorsed candidate for secretary of state. Attorney and psychologist Chris Barden was the endorsed candidate for attorney general. Patricia Anderson was the endorsed candidate for state auditor. All five executive candidates lost their respective elections.

Following the 2010 gubernatorial recount, the Minnesota GOP was heavily in debt, owing $2 million primarily for the recount of votes.  The GOP had stopped paying rent for its headquarters near the Capitol and the landlord filed an eviction summons once the Party had fallen $111,000 behind in rent. They announced they would move their headquarters to Minneapolis's Seward neighborhood in January 2014. The new headquarters is situated diagonally across from the Seward Community Cafe where it shares a building with a Pizza Luce. Party Chairman Keith Downey said they were moving away from St. Paul "to be closer to the people." The headquarters were later moved to Edina.
Despite this, in 2010, Republicans had taken control of both houses of the State Legislature for the first time in three decades, only to lose both houses in 2012.

Recent history
In 2021, the Minnesota Republican Party became a subject of controversy when donor and strategist Anton Lazzaro was indicted for sex trafficking charges. Minnesota Chairwoman Jennifer Carnahan resigned amidst the controversy.

The party ran Scott Jensen for the 2022 gubernatorial race, who lost to incumbent Tim Walz. The party also lost its majority in the Minnesota Senate, giving the DFL a trifecta, but the party held to the four seats in the US House of Representatives.

Ideology and voter-base
The Minnesota Republican Party’s platform is relatively moderate. The party’s main sections are economic growth, education, healthcare, civil rights, public safety, and environmental protection. It has a strong voter base in rural and suburban parts of Greater Minnesota.

2022 Party Platform 
In the party's 2022 platform, the party opposed abortion access, calling for the overturning of Supreme Court decision Roe v. Wade, which subsequently happened, and the Minnesota Doe v. Gomez, which is still standing. It also opposes legal recognition of same-sex marriage. They also "support the prohibition of Ranked Choice Voting in Minnesota." On gun policy, the statement says that citizens who follow the law should "have the right to purchase and possess firearms, free from any gun registration system." For education, the platform also opposes "any element of Critical Race Theory or associated curricula and programs."

Current elected officials
The Minnesota Republican Party holds none of the five statewide elected offices, neither United States Senate seat, and four of the state's eight United States House of Representatives seats. It holds a minority in both the Minnesota Senate and the Minnesota House of Representatives.

Members of Congress

U.S. Senate
 None

Both of Minnesota's U.S. Senate seats have been held by Democrats since 2008. Norm Coleman was the last Republican to represent Minnesota in the U.S. Senate. First elected in 2002, Coleman lost his bid for a second term in 2008 to Al Franken.

U.S. House of Representatives
Out of the 8 seats Minnesota is apportioned in the U.S. House of Representatives, 4 are held by Republicans:

Statewide offices
 None

Minnesota has not elected any GOP candidates to statewide office since 2006, when Tim Pawlenty was narrowly re-elected as governor.  In 2010, Pawlenty opted not to seek re-election to a third term. State representative Tom Emmer ran as the Republican nominee in the 2010 election and was subsequently defeated by Democratic challenger Mark Dayton.

State legislature
 Senate Minority Leader: Mark Johnson
House Minority Leader: Lisa Demuth

See also

 Republican Party of Minnesota v. White
 Politics of Minnesota
 List of political parties in Minnesota

References

External links
 

Minnesota
Political parties in Minnesota